Glukhovsky Uyezd (Глуховский уезд) was one of the subdivisions of the Chernigov Governorate of the Russian Empire. It was situated in the eastern part of the governorate. Its administrative centre was Glukhov (Hlukhiv).

Demographics
At the time of the Russian Empire Census of 1897, Glukhovsky Uyezd had a population of 142,661. Of these, 91.6% spoke Ukrainian, 4.2% Russian, 3.9% Yiddish, 0.1% Polish, 0.1% Belarusian and 0.1% Romani as their native language.

References

 
Uyezds of Chernigov Governorate
Chernigov Governorate